A painter is a creative artist in the medium of painting.

Painter may also refer to:

 Painter (band), a Canadian rock band
 Painter (rope), a rope that is attached to the bow of a boat and used for tying up or for towing
 Painter (surname)
 Painter, Virginia, United States
 Corel Painter, computer software
 house painter, a tradesman responsible for the painting of buildings
 Sweatt v. Painter, a legal case
 Painter Crowe, a DARPA operative in James Rollins' Sigma Force novels
 another name for the cougar
 Painter (film), a 2020 psychological thriller

See also
 The Painter (disambiguation)
 Paint (disambiguation)
 Painting (disambiguation)